Dikov (Cyrillic: Диков) is a Slavic masculine surname, its feminine counterpart is Dikova. It may refer to
Paul Dickov (born 1972), Scottish football player 
Sashko Dikov (born 1955), Bulgarian alpine skier
Svetoslav Dikov (born 1992), Bulgarian football player
Vitali Dikov (born 1989), Russian football player